Thamsyn Michelle Moupia Newton (born 3 June 1995, in Paraparaumu) is a New Zealand cricketer and rugby union player. She plays cricket for Wellington, as well as for her national team, the White Ferns. She plays rugby for Wellington Pride She is a right-handed batsman and right-arm medium pace bowler. In May 2021, Newton was awarded with her first central contract from New Zealand Cricket ahead of the 2021–22 season.

References

External links 

 
 
 Thamsyn Newton at LinkedIn

1995 births
Living people
New Zealand women cricketers
New Zealand women One Day International cricketers
New Zealand women Twenty20 International cricketers
People from Paraparaumu
Wellington Blaze cricketers
Canterbury Magicians cricketers
Perth Scorchers (WBBL) cricketers
People educated at Wellington Girls' College